Three ships of the Royal Navy have borne the name Incendiary, after Incendiary (capable of causing fire): 
 , an 8-gun fireship, wrecked off Isle of Wight in 1780.
 , a 16-gun fireship that the French captured in 1801 in the Mediterranean.
 , a 14-gun fireship, formerly Diligence. Sold in 1812.

Royal Navy ship names